This is a list of the National Register of Historic Places listings in Brooks County, Texas.

This is intended to be a complete list of properties listed on the National Register of Historic Places in Brooks County, Texas. There is one property listed on the National Register in the county. This property is also a Recorded Texas Historic Landmark.

Current listings

The locations of National Register properties may be seen in a mapping service provided.

|}

See also

National Register of Historic Places listings in Texas
Recorded Texas Historic Landmarks in Brooks County

References

External links

Brooks County, Texas
Brooks County
Buildings and structures in Brooks County, Texas